All Nudity Shall Be Punished is a 1973 Brazilian drama film based on Nelson Rodrigues' play by the same name and directed by Arnaldo Jabor. It was entered into the 23rd Berlin International Film Festival where it won the Silver Bear.

Cast
 Paulo Porto as Herculano
 Darlene Glória as Geni
 Elza Gomes as aunt who bathes Serginho
 Paulo César Peréio as Patrício
 Isabel Ribeiro as young aunt
 Henriqueta Brieba as bespectacled aunt
 Sérgio Mamberti as gay man at bordello
 Orazir Pereira as Bolivian thief
 Abel Pera as old poet, Geni's client
 Waldir Onofre as drunkard who fights Serginho
 Teresa Mitota (as Mitota)
 Paulo Sacks as Serginho
 Hugo Carvana as Commissioner

References

External links

1973 drama films
1973 LGBT-related films
1973 films
Brazilian drama films
Brazilian LGBT-related films
Films directed by Arnaldo Jabor
Films shot in Rio de Janeiro (city)
1970s Portuguese-language films